Bastet is a goddess of ancient Egypt

Bastet may also refer to:

 "Bastet" (song) by Belgian singer Natacha Atlas
 Bastet, a character on the TV-series Stargate
 Bastet (mascot), the official Mascot of the 11th Pan Arab Games